= Pyaari Tarawali The True Story =

- Directed by: Rajneeshh Dubey
- Story by: Rajneeshh Dubey
- Produced by: Amit Gupta; Kkalpana Raajputt; Dollye Tomar
- Starring: Dollye Tomar; Uday Atrolia; Bobby Vats; Rajneeshh Dubey; Satya Agnihotri
- Cinematography: P. John Viji
- Edited by: Dhirendra M. Dimri; Yogesh Pandey; Devu Namdev
- Music by: R.P. Sony; Rajneeshh Dubey; S. Kumar
- Production company: Omsheel Production
- Release date: 27 October 2023
- Country: India
- Language: Hindi

Pyaari Tarawali The True Story is a 2023 Indian Hindi-language musical romantic drama film based on the novel of the same name written and directed by Rajneeshh Dubey and produced by Kkalpana Raajputt and Amit Gupta under the banner of Omsheel Productions. The film stars Dollye Tomar, Uday Atrolia, Bobby Vats, Rajneeshh Dubey and Satya Agnihotri in lead role and Bahadur Singh Dangi, Sangeeta Srivastav, Devu Namdev, Sushil Soni in a supporting role.

== Cast ==
- Dollye Tomar as Pyaari
- Uday Atrolia as Mama
- Bobby Vats as Shakil Khan
- Rajneeshh Dubey as Laxman
- Satya Agnihotri as Santosh
- Bahadur Singh Dangi as Pyaari's Father
- Sangeeta Srivastav as Pyaari's Mother
- Devu Namdev as Ishwar
- Sushil Soni as Gopal Kaka
- Ashutosh Yadav as Santosh Friend
